A Simple Life is a 1912 silent short film comedy starring Anna Lehr.

A print is preserved in the Library of Congress collection.

Cast
William Lampe - Jack Vincent
Anna Lehr - Marie Smith
Paul Scardon - Cy Smith, Marie's Father (*as Mr. Scardon)

References

External links
A Simple Life at IMDb.com

1912 films
American silent short films
1912 comedy films
American black-and-white films
Silent American comedy films
1910s American films